The Eriinae form a subtribe of Podochileae, a tribe of the orchid family (Orchidaceae). The name is derived from the genus Eria.

The subtribe includes 24 genera with more than 900 species of epiphytic, lithophytic or (more rarely) terrestrial orchids from tropical regions of India, China, Southeast Asia, and Africa.

Genera:
Aeridostachya (Hook.f.) Brieger
Appendicula Blume
Ascidieria Seidenf.
Bambuseria Schuit., Y.P.Ng & H.A.Pedersen
Bryobium Lindl.
Callostylis Blume
Campanulorchis Brieger
Ceratostylis Blume
Cryptochilus Wall.
Cylindrolobus Blume
Dendrolirium Blume
Dilochiopsis (Hook.f.) Brieger
Epiblastus Schltr.
Eria Lindl.
Mediocalcar J.J.Sm.
Mycaranthes Blume
Oxystophyllum Blume
Pinalia Buch.-Ham. ex Lindl.
Poaephyllum Ridl.
Podochilus Blume
Porpax Lindl.
Pseuderia Schltr.
Strongyleria (Pfitzer) Schuit., Y.P.Ng & H.A.Pedersen
Trichotosia Blume

Footnotes

References
 Cameron, K.M. et al. (1999). "A phylogenetic analysis of the Orchidaceae: evidence from rbcL nucleotide sequences." In: Yukawa and H.G, Hills and D.H. Goldman, (1999). A phylogenetic analysis of the Orchidaceae: evidence from rbcL nucleotide sequences.
 Pridgeon, Alec M., Phillip Cribb, and Mark W. Chase. (2005). Genera Orchidacearum - Volume I: Epidendroideae. Oxford Univ. Press. .

External links
 
 
 History of the taxonomy of orchids
 Orchid Tree: a phylogeny of epiphytes (mostly) on the Tree of Life 

 
Orchid subtribes